The Hangzhou–Wenzhou high-speed railway is a high-speed railway line under construction in China. It is expected to open in 2024.

Stations 
 (through service to )
 
 
 
 
 
 
 
 
 (through service to )

References 

High-speed railway lines in China